Olubanke King Akerele (born May 11, 1946)  is a Liberian politician and diplomat who served as the Minister of Foreign Affairs in the cabinet of Ellen Johnson Sirleaf from October 2007 until her resignation on 3 November 2010. She is the granddaughter of Liberia's 17th president, Charles D. B. King.

Akerele studied at the University of Ibadan in Nigeria and graduated from Brandeis University in Massachusetts, United States with a B.A. in economics. She earned her first M.A. from Northeastern University in manpower economics, then a second M.A. from Columbia University in economics of education. Akerele also completed her first year at the University of Liberia Louis Arthur Grimes School of Law. She later served for over 20 years at the United Nations.

Upon the election of Sirleaf as president in 2005, Akerele was appointed as the Minister of Commerce and Industry. Following a 2007 cabinet shakeup, she replaced veteran diplomat George Wallace as Minister of Foreign Affairs. On 3 November 2010, Sirleaf dismissed her entire cabinet, including Akerele. She resigned that same day. Following the appointment of Toga G. McIntosh as Akerele's successor, Sirleaf disclosed that Akerele had resigned in order to receive medical treatment for an undisclosed illness.

Sources
 "Liberian leader reshuffles cabinet" 24 August 2007, IOL.co.za
 "President Sirleaf Calls Newly Reconstituted Cabinet ‘The Right People for the Job’" 4 December 2010, emansion.gov.lr

External links
Profile at the Ministry of Foreign Affairs

1946 births
Foreign Ministers of Liberia
Living people
Liberian diplomats
Northeastern University alumni
Brandeis University alumni
Columbia University alumni
University of Liberia alumni
Female foreign ministers
University of Ibadan alumni
Women government ministers of Liberia
Liberian women diplomats
21st-century Liberian politicians